Second Bureau may refer to:

 Deuxième Bureau, a French military intelligence agency between 1871 and 1940
 Second Bureau (novel), a work by the French writer Charles Robert-Dumas 
 Second Bureau (1935 film), a French film directed by Pierre Billon 
 Second Bureau (1936 film), a British film directed by Victor Hanbury